Metric temporal logic (MTL) is a special case of temporal logic. It is an extension of temporal logic in which temporal operators are replaced by time-constrained versions like until, next, since and previous operators. It is a linear-time logic that assumes both the interleaving and fictitious-clock abstractions. It is defined over a point-based weakly-monotonic integer-time semantics. 

MTL has been described as a prominent specification formalism for real-time systems. Full MTL over infinite timed words is undecidable.

Syntax 
The full metric temporal logic is defined similarly to linear temporal logic, where a set of non-negative real number is added to temporal modal operators U and S. Formally, MTL is built up from:
 a finite set of propositional variables AP, 
 the logical operators ¬ and ∨, and 

Note that the next operator N is not considered to be a part of MTL syntax. It will instead be defined from other operators.

Past and Future 

The past fragment of metric temporal logic, denoted as past-MTL is defined as the restriction of the full metric temporal logic without the until operator.  Similarly, the future fragment of metric temporal logic, denoted as future-MTL is defined as the restriction of the full metric temporal logic without the since operator.

Depending on the authors, MTL is either defined as the future fragment of MTL, in which case full-MTL is called  MTL+Past. Or MTL is defined as full-MTL.

In order to avoid ambiguity, this article uses the names full-MTL, past-MTL and future-MTL. When the statements holds for the three logic, MTL will simply be used.

Model 

Let  intuitively represent a set
of points in time. Let  a function which associates a letter to
each moment . A model of a MTL formula is
such a function . Usually,  is
either a timed word or a signal. In
those cases,  is either a discrete subset or an interval
containing 0.

Semantics 

We are now going to explain what it means
that a MTL formula  holds at time ,
which is denoted .

We first consider the formula . We say
that  if and only if
there exists some time  such that:
  and

We now consider the formula  (pronounced " since
that  if and only if
there exists some time  such that:
  and

of  not considered above is similar as the definition
in the LTL case.

Operators defined from basic MTL operators 
Some formulas are so often used that a new operator is introduced for
them. These operators are usually not considered to belong to the
definition of MTL, but are syntactic sugar which denote more
complex MTL formula. We first consider operators which also exists in LTL. In
this section, we fix   MTL formulas

Operators similar to the ones of LTL

Release and Back to 
We denote by 
(pronounced " release
formula . This formula holds
at time  if either:
 there is some time  such that  holds, and  hold in the interval .
 at each time ,  holds.

The name "release" come from the LTL case, where this formula simply
means that  should always hold,
unless  releases it.

The past counterpart of release is denote by 
(pronounced " back to
formula .

Finally and Eventually 
Intuitively, this formula holds at time 
if there is some time  such
that  holds.

formula . Intuitively, this formula
holds at time  if for all time ,  holds.

We denote by 
and  the formula similar
Both formula has intuitively the same meaning, but when we
consider the past instead of the future.

Next and previous 
This case is slightly different from the previous ones, because the intuitive meaning of the "Next" and "Previously" formulas differs depending on the kind of function  considered.

formula . The following discussion about the Next operator also holds for the Previously operator, by reversing the past and the future.

When this formula is evaluated over a timed word , this formula
means that both:
 at the next time in the domain of definition , the formula  will holds.
 furthermore, the distance between this next time and the current time belong to the interval .
 In particular, this next time holds, thus the current time is not the end of the word.

When this formula is evaluated over a signal , the notion of next time does
not makes sense. Instead, "next" means "immediately after". More
precisely  means:
  contains an interval of the form  and
 for each , .

Other operators 
We now consider operators which are not similar to any standard LTL operators.

Fall and Rise 
More precisely, either  did not hold in the immediate past, and holds at this time, or it does not hold and it holds in the immediate future.

Over timed words, this formula always hold. Indeed  and  always hold.

History and Prophecy 
We denote by  the formula .

We now consider this formula over timed words and over signals. We consider timed words first. Assume that  where  and  represents either open or closed bounds.
Over timed words, the formula  holds if and only if  also holds. That is, this formula simply assert that, in the future, until the interval  is met,  should not hold. Furthermore,  should hold sometime in the interval . Thus, there exists necessarily a smaller such .

Let us now consider signal. The equivalence mentioned above does not hold anymore over signal. Thus, the formula  also ensures that the first interval in which  holds is closed on the left.

This formula asserts that there exists a last moment in the past such that  held.

Non-strict operator 
The semantic of operators until and since introduced do not consider the current time. This is not always wanted, for example in the sentence "there is no bug until the system is turned-off", it may actually be wanted that there are no bug at current time.

 the formulas  and  if , and
 the formulas  and  otherwise.

For any of the operators  introduced above, we denote  the formula in which non-strict untils and sinces are used.

Strict operator can not be defined using non-strict operator. This formula can never hold at a time  if it is required that  holds at time .

Example  
We now give examples of MTL formulas. Some more example can be found on article of fragments of MITL, such as metric interval temporal logic.
  states that each letter  is followed exactly one time unit later by a letter .
  states that no two successive occurrences of  can occur at exactly one time unit from each other.

Comparison with LTL 
A standard (untimed) infinite word  is a
We can
consider such a word using the set of time ,
and the function . In this case,
for  an arbitrary LTL
formula,  if and only
if , where  is
considered as a MTL formula with non-strict operator and  subscript. In this sense, MTL is an extension of LTL.

For this reason, a formula using only non-strict operator with  subscript is called an LTL formula. This is because the

Algorithmic complexity 
The satisfiability of ECL over signals is EXPSPACE-complete.

Fragments of MTL 
We now consider some fragments of MTL.

MITL 

An important subset of MTL is the Metric Interval Temporal
Logic (MITL). This is defined similarly to MTL, with the
singletons, and whose bounds are natural numbers or infinity.

Some other subsets of MITL are defined in the article MITL.

Future Fragments 
Future-MTL was already introduced above. Both over timed-words and over signals, it is less expressive than Full-MTL.

Event-Clock Temporal Logic  
The fragment Event-Clock Temporal Logic of MTL, denoted EventClockTL or ECL, allows only the following operators:
 the boolean operators, and, or, not
 the untimed until and since operators. 
 The timed prophecy and history operators.

Over signals, ECL is as expressive as MITL and as MITL0. The equivalence between the two last logics is explained in the article MITL0. We sketch the equivalence of those logics with ECL.

Reciprocally, for  an ECL-formula, and  an interval whose lower bound is 0,  is equivalent to the ECL-formula .

The satisfiability of ECL over signals is PSPACE-complete.

Positive normal form 
A MTL-formula in positive normal form is defined almost as any MTL formula, with the two following change:
 the operators Release and Back are introduced in the logical language and are not considered anymore to be notations for some other formulas. 
 negations can only be applied to letters.

Any MTL formula is equivalent to formula in normal form. This can be shown by an easy induction on formulas. For example, the formula  is equivalent to the formula . Similarly, conjunctions and disjunctions can be considered using De Morgan's laws.

Strictly speaking, the set of formulas in positive normal form is not a fragment of MTL.

See also 
 Timed propositional temporal logic, another extension of LTL in which time can be measured.

References

Temporal logic
Model checking